Karl-Maria May (20 May 1886 – 20 March 1963) was an Austrian painter. His work was part of the art competitions at the 1936 Summer Olympics and the 1948 Summer Olympics.

References

1886 births
1963 deaths
20th-century Austrian painters
Austrian male painters
Olympic competitors in art competitions
Artists from Vienna
20th-century Austrian male artists